Devil Town is an American independent mystery film, written and directed by Harvey Mitkas.

Devil Town may also refer to:

 Devil Town, Ohio, an unincorporated community in Wayne County, Ohio, United States
 "Devil Town", a song by Bright Eyes from Noise Floor (Rarities: 1998–2005), 2006
 "Devil Town", a song by Cavetown, 2018
 "Devil Town", a song by Daniel Johnston from 1990, 1990
 "Devil Town", a song by Tony Lucca from Friday Night Lights, 2007

See also
 Devil's Town, a rock formation in southern Serbia